Conviene far bene l'amore (internationally released as The Sex Machine and Love and Energy) is a 1975 sci-fi - sexy comedy film directed by Pasquale Festa Campanile. The film is based on a novel with the same name written by the same Campanile.

Cast 
 Gigi Proietti: Prof. Enrico Coppola
 Agostina Belli: Francesca Renzi
 Eleonora Giorgi: Piera
 Christian De Sica: Daniele Venturoli
 Mario Scaccia: Mons. Alberoni
 Adriana Asti: Irene Nobili
 Franco Agostini: Dr. Spina
 Monica Strebel: Angela
 Quinto Parmeggiani: De Renzi
 Gino Pernice:  Coppola's Assistant
 Mario Pisu: Minister 
 Franco Angrisano:  Hotel Director 
 Enzo Robutti: Matteis
 Oreste Lionello: Driver
 Aldo Reggiani
 Pietro Tordi

References

Bibliography
Willis, Donald C. (1985), Variety's Complete Science Fiction Reviews, Garland Publishing Inc., p. 299,

External links

1975 films
Commedia sexy all'italiana
Films directed by Pasquale Festa Campanile
Italian science fiction comedy films
1970s sex comedy films
Films scored by Fred Bongusto
1970s science fiction comedy films
1975 comedy films
1970s Italian-language films
1970s Italian films